10 Cent Pistol is a 2014 American crime thriller film directed by Michael C. Martin and starring Jena Malone.

Plot

Cast
Jena Malone as Danneel
JT Alexander as Jake
Damon Alexander as Easton
Joe Mantegna as Punchy
Adam Arkin as Nir Zir
Brendan Sexton III as Donny
Thomas Ian Nicholas as H-Wood
Jessica Szohr as Chelsea
Emilio Rivera as Melville
Amir Talai as Amir

Distribution
The film's producers' ran a Kickstarter campaign to facilitate distribution. The campaign was successful, beating their $10,000 target by $1,161. However, they faced criticism from the project's backers when they failed to deliver the rewards that were promised.

Reception
The film has a 43% rating on Rotten Tomatoes based on seven critic reviews, with an average rating of 5/10.  Clayton Dillard of Slant Magazine gave the film two stars out of four.

References

External links
 
 
 

2014 crime thriller films
American crime thriller films
Films scored by James Dooley
Phase 4 Films films
2010s English-language films
2010s American films